Deborah Weisz is an American jazz musician. She plays lead trombone for the Deborah Weisz Quintet/Trio.

Early life
Deborah Weisz was born in Chicago to Victor and Alice Mae. She grew up in Phoenix, where she began to play trombone at the age of ten.

Career
Weisz studied music at Mesa Community College in Mesa, Arizona and at the University of Nevada, Las Vegas. After graduation, she became a freelance musician in Las Vegas. While in Las Vegas, Weisz studied and worked with jazz trombonist Carl Fontana. From 1987-1994, she performed for Frank Sinatra.

In 2002, Weisz earned a Master of Arts in Music Composition from New York University. She has taught at Western Connecticut State University and in New York City.

As a composer and arranger, she has worked with the Afrikan Amerikan Jazz Orchestra, NYU Concert Jazz Orchestra, and Lou Caputo.

Discography
 Breaking Up, Breaking Out (Va Wah) 1997 
 Grace, (Va Wah), 2005

Awards
 Julius Hemphill Jazz Composition Contest (2000)
 BMI Foundation/Charlie Parker Composition Award Finalist (2001)
 New England Foundation for the Arts Meet the Composer Commission (2004)

References

External links
 

Living people
Jazz trombonists
Musicians from Phoenix, Arizona
Western Connecticut State University people
Musicians from Las Vegas
Musicians from New York City
1962 births
21st-century trombonists